The Dowding Ministry was the 30th Ministry of the Government of Western Australia, and was led by Labor Premier Peter Dowding and his deputy, David Parker. It succeeded the Burke Ministry on 25 February 1988, upon the retirement of Brian Burke from politics on the fifth anniversary of his becoming Premier.

The Ministry was reconstituted on 28 February 1989 following the 1989 election, due in part to the defeat of one minister, Barry Hodge (MLA for Melville), and the Parliamentary Secretary of the Cabinet, John Read (MLA for Mandurah), by opposition Liberal candidates.

The second term of the Ministry was a particularly difficult one due to ongoing revelations relating to the government's past dealings with relation to WA Inc, and with a federal election approaching, considerable pressure was being exerted on the State Government. On 7 February 1990, a majority of the 47-member Labor caucus signed an open letter calling on Dowding to step down, and in a caucus meeting on 12 February 1990, Dowding and Parker resigned. The Ministry was succeeded six days later by the Lawrence Ministry led by the Minister for Education and Aboriginal Affairs, Dr Carmen Lawrence, and her deputy, Ian Taylor.

Members

First Ministry
On 25 February 1988, the Governor, Gordon Reid, designated 17 principal executive offices of the Government under section 43(2) of the Constitution Acts Amendment Act 1899. The following ministers were then appointed to the positions, and served until the reconstitution of the Ministry on 28 February 1989.

The members of the First Dowding Ministry were:

 On 7 June 1988, Julian Grill became, in addition to his earlier responsibilities, Minister assisting the Minister for Economic Development and Trade.
 On 4 February 1989, Barry Hodge ceased to be a Member of the Legislative Assembly, having lost the seat of Melville, but continued to hold a position in the Ministry until a caucus meeting was held to reconstitute the Ministry.

Second Ministry
On 28 February 1989, the Governor, Gordon Reid, reconstituted the Ministry. He designated 17 principal executive offices of the Government and appointed the following ministers to the positions, who served until the Lawrence Ministry was established on 19 February 1990.

On 12 February 1990, Premier Peter Dowding resigned all of his ministerial portfolios, being replaced in them temporarily by Carmen Lawrence, who retained Education and Aboriginal Affairs. Deputy Premier David Parker resigned purely as Deputy Premier, retaining the Treasury, Resources Development and the Arts; Ian Taylor became Deputy Premier and retained Police and Emergency Services, Conservation and Land Management and Waterways.

The members of the Ministry were:

References
 Hansard Indexes for 1988–1990, "Legislature of Western Australia"
 
 
 
 
 
 
 
 

Western Australian ministries
Australian Labor Party ministries in Western Australia
Ministries of Elizabeth II